Palaeomolis rubescens is a moth of the subfamily Arctiinae. It was described by Hervé de Toulgoët in 1983. It is found in Ecuador.

References

Arctiini
Moths described in 1983